Parena is a genus of beetles in the family Carabidae, containing the following species:

 Parena africana (Alluaud, 1917) 
 Parena albomaculata Habu, 1979 
 Parena alluaudi Jeannel, 1949  
 Parena amamiooshimensis Habu, 1964
 Parena andrewesi Jedlicka, 1934  
 Parena bicolor Motschulsky, 1859 
 Parena cavipennis Bates, 1873 
 Parena circumdata Shibata, 1987 
 Parena dorae Basilewsky, 1955 
 Parena dorsigera Schaum, 1863 
 Parena esakii Habu, 1969 
 Parena fasciata (Chaudoir, 1872 
 Parena ferruginea (Chaudoir, 1978) 
 Parena hastata (Heller, 1921) 
 Parena kataevi Kirschenhofer, 2006 
 Parena koreana Kirschenhofer, 1994
 Parena kunmingensis Kirschenhofer, 1996
 Parena kurosai Habu, 1967 
 Parena laesipennis Bates, 1873 
 Parena latecincta Bates, 1873 
 Parena levata Andrewes, 1931 
 Parena madagascariensis (Alluaud, 1917) 
 Parena malaisei Andrewes, 1947
 Parena mellea (Chaudoir, 1872) 
 Parena monostigma (Bates, 1873) 
 Parena monticola Shibata, 1987 
 Parena nantouensis Kirschenhofer, 1996 
 Parena nepalensis Kirschenhofer, 1994 
 Parena nigrolineata Chaudoir, 1852 
 Parena obenbergeri Jedlicka, 1952 
 Parena obscura Mateu, 1977 
 Parena pendleburyi Andrewes, 1931 
 Parena perforata (Bates, 1873) 
 Parena picea (W.J.Macleay, 1871) 
 Parena plagiata Motschulsky, 1864 
 Parena politissima (Chaudoir In Oberthur, 1883) 
 Parena quadrisignata Mateu, 1977 
 Parena rubripicta Andrewes, 1928 
 Parena rufotestacea Jedlicka, 1934 
 Parena schillhammeri Kirschenhofer, 2006 
 Parena sellata Heller, 1921 
 Parena shapingensis Xie & Yu, 1993 
 Parena sticta (Andrewes, 1947) 
 Parena stigmatica (Fairmaire, 1899) 
 Parena sulawesiensis Kirschenhofer, 2006 
 Parena tesari Jedlicka, 1951 
 Parena testacea Chaudoir, 1872 
 Parena tripunctata (Bates, 1873) 
 Parena wrasei Kirschenhofer, 2006 
 Parena yunnana Kirschenhofer, 1994

References

Lebiinae
Carabidae genera